Fletcherinia is a genus of moths in the subfamily Arctiinae. It contains the single species Fletcherinia decaryi, which is found in Madagascar.

References

External links 
 Natural History Museum Lepidoptera generic names catalog

Arctiinae